Mastermind-like protein 2 is a protein that in humans is encoded by the MAML2 gene.

See also 

Details on the activity of the N-terminal domain of Mastermind-like protein 2 may be found under MamL-1.

References

Further reading